Şambulbinə (also, Shambulbina) is a village forming part of the municipality of Qazma.

References 

Populated places in Balakan District